Manfred Schmid(t) may refer to:
 Manfred Schmid (born 1944), Austrian luger
 Manfred Schmid (footballer) (born 1971), Austrian football coach
 Manfred Hermann Schmid (born 1947), German musicologist 
 Manfred G. Schmidt (born 1948), German professor of political science

 Manni Schmidt (born 1964), German heavy metal guitarist and songwriter